Schmalenbeck is a station on the Großhansdorf branch of Hamburg U-Bahn line U1, located in the town of Großhansdorf.

History
The station was built following schematics by Eugen Göbel in 1914 and was opened in 1921. The second track at the station was added a year later, in 1922.

Services
Schmalenbeck is served by Hamburg U-Bahn line U1.

References

U1 (Hamburg U-Bahn) stations
Hamburg U-Bahn stations in Schleswig-Holstein
Buildings and structures in Stormarn (district)
Transport infrastructure completed in 1914
Railway stations in Germany opened in 1921